Anatoly Ilyich Bibilov (born 6 February 1970) is a Russian and South Ossetian military officer, was the 4th President of South Ossetia. He succeeded Leonid Tibilov as president on 21 April 2017 to 24 May 2022, following his election victory, but was defeated by Alan Gagloev in the 2022 election.

Biography
Bibilov was born in the South Ossetian AO of the Georgian SSR in the Soviet Union. After eight grade he went to a boarding school in Tbilisi with intensive military and physical training, thereafter he joined the Ryazan Higher Airborne Command School. After graduating, Bibilov was distributed to the 76th Guards Air Assault Division. His division was included in the consolidated battalion of peacekeepers in South Ossetia. Subsequently he joined the South Ossetian Army, commanding a special forces unit. Between the period 1998-2008 he rejoined the peacekeeping forces, this time in a North Ossetia battalion. Bibilov took an active part in the 2008 South Ossetian war, organizing the defence of one of the districts of Tskhinvali against the Georgian Armed Forces.

Politics 
In October 2008 he was appointed Minister of Emergency Situations of South Ossetia. Bibilov was the presidential candidate for the Unity Party in the South Ossetian presidential election, 2011. He won the first round, but lost the runoff to Alla Dzhioyeva.

Soon however, the parliament of South Ossetia declared the elections invalid. Leonid Tibilov was ultimately elected president after winning the South Ossetian presidential election, 2012, which Bibilov did not participate in. In June 2014 he was elected as the president of the parliament of South Ossetia. He is currently the head of the United Ossetia party, which nominated him for their candidate to the South Ossetian presidential election, 2017. Bibilov won the election in the first round by getting 54.8% of the vote and took office as the 4th president of South Ossetia on 21 April 2017. During his inauguration, delegations from the Nagorno-Karabakh Republic, the Donetsk and Lugansk People's Republics and Russia were present.

Bibilov supports South Ossetia joining Russia, and has called for a referendum on the issue.

Bibilov was defeated by Alan Gagloyev in the 2022 election.

Sanctions 
In September 2015, he was included in the sanctions list of Ukraine. Bibilov was recognized as a person who creates "real and/or potential threats to national interests, national security, sovereignty and territorial integrity of Ukraine." Bibilov probably fell under this definition because of repeated visits to the unrecognized DPR and LPR, as well as to Crimea.

Awards 

 Uatsamonga Order (2008, South Ossetia)
 Order of Friendship (1 September 2011, Russia)
 Order of the Umayyads 1st Class (2018, Syria)

Personal life 
He is married with four children.

References 

1970 births
Living people
Ossetian politicians
People from Tskhinvali
Russian military personnel
Ryazan Guards Higher Airborne Command School alumni
South Ossetian military personnel
South Ossetian independence activists
Presidents of South Ossetia
United Ossetia politicians